was a town located in Nasu District, Tochigi Prefecture, Japan.

As of 2003, the town had an estimated population of 13,128 and a density of 160.96 persons per km². The total area was 81.56 km².

On October 1, 2005, Minaminasu, along with the town of Karasuyama (also from Nasu District), was merged to create the city of Nasukarasuyama and no longer exists as an independent municipality.

External links
Nasukarasuyama official website 

Dissolved municipalities of Tochigi Prefecture